Adonten Senior High School is a coeducational first-cycle institution located south of Aburi in the Eastern Region of Ghana.

The school runs courses in Business, Science, general arts, general agric, Home Economics and visual arts, leading to the award of a West African Senior School Certificate (WASSCE).

History 
The school was established in 1957 by Moses Agyare Kwabi and Djan Opare-Addo (both retired Circuit Court Judges) as a private school. However, in 1963, the Ministry of Education took charge of the school and changed it into the public system as a day secondary school with hostel attached.

In 1972–73 academic year, the Government of Ghana fully took over the running of the school. The Objective was to maintain self-discipline and moral uprightness to improve discipline and to provide full secondary school education to the growing number of boys and girls, especially those resident around the Akuapem North and South community.

The school runs both day, boarding and hostel system with majority of the students in the boarding house.

Enrollment 
The school has about 2,500 students enrolled in Business, Science, general arts, general agric, Home Economics and visual arts courses.

Facilities 

 3 Science Laboratories ( Physics, Biology and Chemistry)
 I.C.T Lab
 Library
 Home Economics Lab
 Visual Arts Center
 School Farm
 Sports (standard field for soccer and athletics, basketball court, volley and handball court)
 School Clinic
 Barbering shop

See also 

 Education in Ghana
 List of senior high schools in Ghana

References 

1957 establishments in Ghana
Education in the Eastern Region (Ghana)
Educational institutions established in 1957
High schools in Ghana